Terada Station is the name of multiple train stations in Japan:

Terada Station (Kyoto), in Jōyō, Kyoto
Terada Station (Toyama), in Tateyama, Nakaniikawa District, Toyama Prefecture